Eucorys is a genus of large sea snails, marine gastropod mollusks in the family Cassidae, the helmet snails and bonnet snails.

Species
Species within the genus Eucorys include:
 Eucorys barbouri (Clench & Aguayo, 1939)
 Eucorys bartschi (Rehder, 1943)

References

External links

Cassidae